The 2004–05 FA Cup was the 124th season of the world's oldest football competition, the FA Cup. The competition began on 28 August 2004, with the lowest-ranked of the entrants competing in the Extra Preliminary Round. For England's top 44 clubs, from the 2004–05 Premier League and 2004–05 Football League Championship, the FA Cup began at the third round in January.

Ties were all single-legged and took place at the stadium of the club drawn first. If scores were level at the end of a match, the match was replayed at the away club's stadium, usually in the middle of the following week. If the scores are still level, extra-time and penalties (if necessary) are used to determine a winner. From the semi-finals onwards, the ties take place at a neutral stadium, and there are no replays. That is to say, extra-time and penalties are played if necessary to determine a winner in a single match.

The new Wembley Stadium was still at least a year away from being ready for use, so the final was staged at the Millennium Stadium, Cardiff on 21 May 2005. The final was won by Arsenal on penalties after a goalless draw with holders Manchester United, the first time that the FA Cup Final had been decided on penalties.

Calendar

First round proper

This round is the first in which Football League teams from League One and League Two compete with non-league teams.
Ties were played over the weekend of 13 November and 14 November 2004.

Second round proper
Ties were played over the weekend of 4 December 2004.

Third round proper
This round marks the first time Championship and Premier League (top-flight) teams play. Matches were played on the weekend of Saturday, 8 January 2005.

One of the surprise results of this round came at Old Trafford where holders Manchester United were held to a 0-0 home draw against Conference National side Exeter City, although United won the replay 2-0.

United's neighbours City suffered humiliation at the hands of League One strugglers Oldham Athletic, who defeated them 1-0 at Boundary Park.

Fourth round proper
Ties played during the weekend of 29 January 2005

Fifth round proper
Matches played weekend of 19 February 2005 - replays played week commencing 28 February 2005.

The only non-Premiership side to win in this round were Leicester City, who triumphed 2-1 at Premier League side Charlton Athletic.

Sixth round proper
Matches played on the weekend of Saturday, 12 March 2005.

Leicester City, the only remaining non-Premiership side in the competition, lost 1–0 to Blackburn Rovers.

Semi-finals

Matches played on the weekend of Saturday, 16 April 2005.
Both ties were played at neutral venues

Final

The 2005 FA Cup Final was contested between Manchester United and Arsenal at the Millennium Stadium in Cardiff. Manchester United dominated the game but failed to take any of their opportunities and ultimately they went on to lose in the first FA Cup Final penalty shoot-out. Paul Scholes had his kick saved by Jens Lehmann, leaving Patrick Vieira with the opportunity to win the Cup for the Gunners.

Top scorers
Source:

Media coverage
In the United Kingdom, the BBC were the free to air broadcasters for the fourth consecutive season while Sky Sports were the subscription broadcasters for the seventeenth consecutive season.. In this new contract period of television rights, the BBC's coverage increased further to three live matches from rounds 3 to 6, plus one live replay in the same rounds where applicable.

The matches shown live on the BBC were Thurrock 0–1 Oldham Athletic (R1); Hinckley United 0–0 Brentford (R2); Sheffield United 3–1 Aston Villa, Plymouth Argyle 1–3 Everton and Yeading 0–2 Newcastle United (R3); Exeter City 0–2 Manchester United (R3 replay); Southampton 2–1 Portsmouth, Manchester United 3–0 Middlesbrough and Oldham Athletic 0–1 Bolton Wanderers; Tottenham Hotspur 3–1 West Bromwich Albion (R4 replay); Arsenal 1–1 Sheffield United, Everton 0–2 Manchester United and Burnley 0–0 Blackburn Rovers (R5); Sheffield United 0–0 Arsenal (R5 replay); Bolton Wanderers 0–1 Arsenal, Southampton 0–4 Manchester United and Blackburn Rovers 1–0 Leicester City (QF); Newcastle United 1–4 Manchester United (SF); and Arsenal 0–0 Manchester United (Final).

References

External links
The FA Cup Archive at TheFA.com
FA Cup at BBC.co.uk
FA Cup news at Reuters.co.uk

 
2004-05
2004–05 domestic association football cups
FA